Bernhard Fölkel (born 26 March 1953) is a German rower. He competed in the men's coxless four event at the 1976 Summer Olympics.

References

1953 births
Living people
German male rowers
Olympic rowers of West Germany
Rowers at the 1976 Summer Olympics
Rowers from Cologne